Elton is an unincorporated community located in Langlade County, Wisconsin, United States. Elton is located on Wisconsin Highway 64 east of Antigo, in the town of Evergreen. Elton had a post office, which closed on May 21, 2011.

References

Unincorporated communities in Langlade County, Wisconsin
Unincorporated communities in Wisconsin